Assumption College (often known as ACK, where the K stands for Kilmore) is an Australian Catholic co-educational secondary day and boarding school. The school is located in the town of Kilmore, Victoria. The College was founded in 1893 by the Marist Brothers and is part of a network of Marist schools in Australia and throughout the world.

Assumption College first took in boarders 1901 to meet the educational needs of Catholic families throughout regional Victoria and southern New South Wales. Established initially as a boys' school primarily accepting boarders, the proportion of day students has progressively grown since the 1970s and boarding numbers have diminished. The school became co-educational in 1971 and girls began boarding in 1995.

Assumption College is governed by Marist Schools Australia and is supported by the Catholic Education Commission of Victoria. Assumption became a member of the Associated Grammar Schools of Victoria (AGSV) in 1958 which provides a broad sporting competition for students. Since 2000, girls sport has been supplemented through membership of the Associated Public Schools of Victoria (APS) competition
 
The current principal is Ms Kate Fogarty, the college's first female principal.

History: The Marist Brothers
The Marist Brothers order was established as a teaching order in France in 1817 by a priest, Father Marcellin Champagnat (1789 – 1840), with a particular goal of providing elementary education to underprivileged rural children. The Marist Brothers were invited to Australia by the Archbishop of Sydney, arriving in 1872. From the original plan to provide primary education for the underprivileged, both in Sydney and later in other cities, they changed their ideas and also opened elite secondary schools for which significant fees were charged. From this income, monies could be diverted to subsidise the education of the less privileged. 
From humble origins in rural France, the order established by Marcellin Champagnat grew to spread across the globe and there are now Marist schools in 79 countries on five continents (Europe, Africa, the Americas, Asia, and Oceania). This includes 52 Marist schools in Australia. Marcellin Champagnat was declared Venerable in 1920 by Pope Benedict XV, declared Blessed (beatified) by Pope Pius XII in 1955 and canonised by Pope John Paul II in 1999. Thus he is now recognised as Saint Marcellin Champagnat.

History: Assumption College
The Marist Brothers were invited to Kilmore to start a primary school for local boys in 1893.  This they did, but as the new century approached the Catholic educational needs of rural families from northern Victoria and southern New South Wales had to be considered. In 1901 the first boarder was enrolled at the College, as a response to the needs of those families. In 1907 the school was registered and officially known as Assumption College, Kilmore. 
The College continued to grow as a boys’ boarding school with a smaller day boys component until 1971, when the first two girls were enrolled. These young women paved the way for the introduction of full co-education in the day school in 1985-86 and full co-education in the boarding house in 1995-96.

Past Principals
1893-97 Br Austin Summers 
1897-01 Br Gabriel 
1902-09 Br Bernadine Callaghan 
1910-15 Br Brendan Hill
1916-21 Br Paulinus McColl
1922-27 Br William Molloy
1928-30 Br Gilbert O’Donohue
1931-38 Br William Molloy
1937-42 Br Hiliary Conroy
1943      Br William Molloy
1944-49 Br Damien Willis
1950-52 Br Kenneth Harris
1953-58 Br Sylvester Mannes
1959-64 Br Geoffrey Daly
1965-70 Br Romuald O’Brien
1971-73 Br Kenneth Harris
1974      Br Terrence Orrell
1975-76 Br Ambrose Kelly
1977-79 Br Columbanus Pratt
1980-82 Br Seamus O’Grady
1983-84 Br Paul Gilchrist
1985-90 Br Valerian Braniff
1991-96    Br Paul Kane 
1997-05 Br Fons van Rooij
2006-14 Mr Michael Kenny
2015 – Current   Ms Kate Fogarty

Curriculum
Year 7 students are exposed to a wide range of subjects including design technologies (wood, food, metal and textiles), digital technologies, English, humanities, the sciences, health and physical education, languages (both French and Italian) and religious education. 
From Years 8-10 students participate in the MyMAP Program. MyMAP is a vertical curriculum seeking to build mastery, autonomy and purpose in student learning. Students and their parents can select subjects from a substantive list of vertical classes, catering to individual choice and learner development.
In Years 11 and 12, students can study for one of two senior certificates: the Victorian Certificate of Education (VCE) or the Victorian Certificate of Applied Learning (VCAL). Within these, students can also complete units in Vocational Educational and Training (VET) or be part of a school-based apprenticeship (SBAT). 
Assumption College is the home of the Marlhes Restaurant, which is a vocational training centre and functioning restaurant. The restaurant caters for special functions and an a la carte seated dining room.

Sport
As the College is built on over 100 acres (40 hectares) there are extensive facilities for outdoor sports. In addition to the Carroll (main) Oval, the College has tennis and netball courts, hockey pitches, soccer fields, softball diamonds, a large indoor stadium, dance studios and a gymnasium.  The following sports are played and teams and representatives participate in the AGS competitions in these sports: AFL & AFLW, basketball, soccer, cricket, tennis, swimming, netball, volleyball, athletics, touch rugby, softball and cross country. Most sports are open to girls and boys. Boys teams at all ages compete in the AGS sports calendar while girls teams now compete in a calendar of events with teams drawn from both the AGS and the Associated Public Schools.  Since joining the AGS in 1959, ACK has won the AGS football premiership on 36 occasions, including every year of its first ten years of entering the competition. The College also maintains an active equestrian program, golfing, lawn bowls and clay-target teams. The College was a founding member of the Associated Catholic Colleges in 1911 until 1975.

AGSV & AGSV/APS premierships 
Assumption College has won the following AGSV & AGSV/APS premierships.

Boys:

 Athletics - 1972
 Cricket (13) - 1961, 1968, 1969, 1978, 1979, 1980, 1988, 1989, 1991, 2003, 2005, 2008, 2009
 Football (38) - 1959, 1960, 1961, 1962, 1963, 1964, 1965, 1966, 1967, 1968, 1970, 1974, 1975, 1976, 1977, 1978, 1979, 1980, 1981, 1982, 1985, 1986, 1987, 1988, 1989, 1990, 1991, 1992, 1996, 2001, 2002, 2003, 2004, 2005, 2008, 2009, 2014, 2021,2022
 Golf - 1990
 Tennis - 1967

Girls:

 Basketball - 2001

Co-curriculum
Students have many ways to become involved in the vibrant cultural life of the College. Whether they are interested in singing, playing a musical instrument, acting, dancing or debating there are plenty of opportunities to perform.  Each year a junior or senior drama production is staged.  Students in sessional dance classes and those in dance classes from Years 9 to 12 showcase at an annual dance concert. 
There are four bands and four musical ensembles that students can join, depending on their year level, and singers can join the choir or work on their solo performances. Musicians and singers get to showcase their talents at musical soirees and annual talent contest. They also perform at full-school assemblies and Masses, and join the dancers at the Assumption Day concert and the annual cultural and sporting exchange with Sacred Heart College, Adelaide. Debaters also take part in that exchange, and Assumption is a member of the Debating Association of Victoria’s school competition.

Hall of Excellence 
In 2014, Assumption College created a Hall of Excellence    to acknowledge past students and to inspire current and future students of ACK.  Nominees are called for every five years.

Sporting achievements
For many years Assumption College has been known for its record of producing AFL/VFL footballers, including several who captained their AFL teams (Francis Bourke, Neil Danaher and Shane Crawford). Shane Crawford also won the prestigious Brownlow Medal.

AFL/VFL Team of the Century
In 2015 a “team of the century” was selected and its membership  was: 
Back line: Kevin Heath (218 VFL/AFL games; Hawthorn); Peter McCormack (165 VFL/AFL games; Collingwood); Tom Lonergan (145* VFL/AFL games; Geelong)
Half back line: David King (214 VFL/AFL games; North Melbourne); Laurie Serafini  (146 VFL/AFL games; Fitzroy); Neale Daniher (82 VFL/AFL games; Essendon)
Centre line:  Francis Bourke (300 VFL/AFL games; Richmond); Shane Crawford (305 VFL/AFL games; Hawthorn); Brendan Edwards (109 VFL/AFL games; Hawthorn)
Half forward line: Ben Dixon  (207 VFL/AFL games; Hawthorn); John Brady (118 VFL/AFL games; North Melbourne); Richard Douglas (155* VFL/AFL games; Adelaide)
Forward line:  Michael Green (146 VFL/AFL games; Richmond); Billy Brownless (198 VFL/AFL games; Geelong); Bernie McCarthy (148 VFL/AFL games; North Melbourne)
Followers: Peter Keenan (213 VFL/AFL games; Melbourne, Essendon and North Melbourne) Jason Johnson (184 VFL/AFL games; Essendon); Peter Crimmins (176 VFL/AFL games; Hawthorn)
Interchange: Jim Gallagher (151 VFL/AFL games; Footscray); Greg Stockdale (106 VFL/AFL games; Essendon);  Barry Young  (142 VFL/AFL games; Richmond, Essendon and North Melbourne); John Reeves (110 VFL/AFL games: North Melbourne); Dion Prestia (73* VFL/AFL games; Gold Coast); Michael Barlow  (89* VFL/AFL games; Fremantle); Ray Garby  (86 VFL/AFL games; Carlton); Daniel Talia (76 VFL/AFL games; Adelaide).
At the 2018 celebrations, the Cricketing Team of the Century was announced made up of : Simon O’Donnell, Captain (1978–80); Peter Ryan, Vice-captain (1961–69); David Joss*(1929–32); Desmond Purdon* ( 1940–42); Nildo Munari  (1949–57); John Bahen* (1960–62); Peter Crimmins*  (1963-65); Neale Daniher (1977–78); Peter Tossol  (1979–80); Ray Power (1979–82); Stephen Gemmill  (1985–87); Jon Henry (1983–88); Jason Smith (1987-90); Jarrod Travaglia (1996–98);Jamie Sheahan (2007-08) and  Tallan Wright (2005–10).

Old Collegians Association (and football team)
The College has an active Old Collegians Association. Its functions include support for the College, arranging social functions and regional reunions, facilitating class reunions and contributing to the College magazine Shandon Calls. 
In 1964, the Old Collegians Association entered a team in the Victorian Amateur Football League (VAFL) with some early success. However, because many old collegians return to live in rural Victoria and NSW, maintaining a stand-alone team has proven difficult. Since 2011 the Old Collegians team has participated in the VAFL as Prahran Football Club. The team has been successful as it won Division 2 in 2018 and is currently playing in Division 1.

The College Song
When Shandon Calls

(The lyrics to the school song were composed by C J Dennis (1876-1938) and relate to the original school bell which had come from a ship, the Shandon, which first sailed from Glasgow in 1883.)

Awake, awake, when Shandon rings into the crisp Australian air.
Be glad or grave the tale it brings, we shall be there, we must be there.
When duty calls, when pleasure waits, the tongue of Shandon, day by day,
Peals out the message of the fates that guide our dear old A.C.K.

Refrain

A.C.K, strive for its high renown, boys,
A.C.K , never let it down, boys,
A.C.K , honour to it come what may,
It shall ever be our aim to battle for the fame,
And the glory of the A.C.K

For friends, for friends, Old Shandon's peal cements a friendship well begun;
And thro' the years, for woe or weal, its note shall guide us everyone.
When wide afar our footsteps roam, mid strangers on a distant day,
Dear mem'ries of our home from home shall bind us still to A.C.K

Refrain

Notable alumni 
Until the 1970s, the total enrolments for nearly half a century averaged only 300 boys so the original ACK was not a large school. In addition, many students left school before Year 12 to return to assist their families on rural properties. 
Religious life. Over 130 Old Collegians have been ordained as priests and bishops. These include Bishops Hugh Ryan, Peter Connors, Noel Daly and Peter De Campo. Many of the priests have become well-known to Australians because of their community service including Mons Jim Hannan, Fr Paul Keenan SJ, Fr John Brosnan and Fr Michael Elligate AM.
Arts, philosophy, politics, law. Prominent Old Collegians in these fields include Professor Bill Aughterson (education), Professor Max Charlesworth (philosophy), Mr Jack Keenan QC (law) and Mr Damian Drum MP and Mr Sam Birrell MP(politics).
Film, literature and media. Notably Fred Schepisi, AO (film director, producer and screenwriter), Tony MacNamara (film director, producer and screenwriter) and Jeremy Burge (founder of Emojipedia).
Medicine. Notably Peter Ryan (surgeon), Keith Grabeau, (GP and past president of the ACK Old Collegians), James Cummins AM (neurosurgeon), Jack Kennedy AM (ENT surgeon) and Kerry Breen AM (physician).
Sport Notably in AFL/VFL football, Francis Bourke, Neale Daniher, Shane Crawford and all the members selected in the ACK AFL/VFL Team of the Century (see below).  Notably in cricket Simon O’Donnell and the members of the ACK Cricket Team of the Century (see below).
Philanthropy and community service.  Notably Simon Costa, Ted Dumaresq, Kevin Butler and the Anderson family.

See also 
 List of schools in Victoria
 List of high schools in Victoria

References

Further reading
Br Valerian Braniff. The Quest for Higher Things. Trustees of the Marist Brothers, Melb 1992  
Ray Carroll. The fields are green: Assumption College, Kilmore: chronicles of a country boarding school. Kilmore, Vic. Lowden Publishing, 1976. 
Ray Carroll. From the boundary: football at Assumption. R.W. Carroll, Kilmore, 1979.

External links
Assumption College website

Catholic secondary schools in Melbourne
Association of Marist Schools of Australia
Associated Grammar Schools of Victoria
Educational institutions established in 1893
Catholic boarding schools in Australia
1893 establishments in Australia
Boarding schools in Victoria (Australia)